Maryland Route 265 (MD 265) is a state highway in the U.S. state of Maryland.  Known as Mackall Road, the state highway runs  from the beginning of state maintenance near Mutual north to MD 264 at Mutual.  MD 265 was constructed in the late 1920s and early 1930s.  The state highway originally extended south through Wallville to St. Leonard Creek.  MD 265's southern terminus was moved north four times between 1962 and 1995.

Route description

Mackall Road continues south as a county highway through Wallville and Mackall to the end of the road at St. Leonard Creek near the Jefferson Patterson Park and Museum. MD 265 heads north as a two-lane undivided road through wooded areas with some fields and homes to the community of Mutual, where the highway reaches its northern terminus at MD 264 (Broomes Island Road), which continues north to an intersection with MD 2/MD 4 (Solomons Island Road) in Port Republic.

History
MD 265 originally extended south from Mutual  to the hamlet of Mackall at the mouth of St. Leonard Creek. The first section of the state highway was constructed as a gravel road from Mutual in 1929. MD 265 was completed to St. Leonard Creek between 1930 and 1933. The state highway has been progressively truncated since 1962 when the southern terminus was rolled back from St. Leonard Creek to north of Wallville. MD 265 was truncated again in 1963 and 1967 before the final adjustment around 1995 that resulted in the state highway's current length.

Junction list

See also

References

External links

MDRoads: MD 265
Jefferson Patterson Park & Museum

265
Maryland Route 265